The Sharp PC-1500 was a pocket computer produced by Sharp between 1981 and 1985. A rebadged version was also sold as the TRS-80 Pocket Computer PC-2.

The whole computer was designed around the LH5801, an 8-bit CPU similar to the Zilog Z80, but all laid-out in power-saving CMOS circuits. Equipped with 2KB of on-board RAM, the programming language is BASIC. Later German engineers provided an assembler for the machine. Later even a C compiler followed.
An external slot is available and accepts memory (from 4 KB to 32 KB) and ROM modules.

Eight versions of this pocket computer with 2 KB memory:
Sharp PC-1500 - Japanese version (1981)
Sharp PC-1500 - Japanese version with blue paint around LCD. CE-157 Kana module bundle model. Known as PC-1500D (1984)
Sharp PC-1500 - European, Australasian and North American version (1982)
Sharp PC-1500 RP2 - Brazilian version (1982)
HiradasTechnika PTA-4000 - Hungarian licence.
HiradasTechnika PTA-4000+16 - Hungarian licence (with internal 16 KB memory extension)
Tandy TRS-80 PC-2
Nanfeng PC-1500A - Chinese license (CKD assembly from Japanese components)

Two versions with 8 KB memory:
Sharp PC-1501 - Japanese rework with 8 KB memory (1984)
Sharp PC-1500A - Western rework with 8 KB memory (1984)

Technical specifications
156×7 pixel LCD
Integrated speaker
Integrated RTC
Memory/cartridge slot
60-pin expansion port for printer and tape drive
Battery slot (4×AA)
Connector for external power supply (Official adaptor is Sharp EA-150, rated at 500 mA at 9 V, comes with the CE-150 printer interface.)

Accessories 
CE-150 4-colour printer/plotter and cassette interface in travel case. Known as KA-160 with PTA-4000.
CE-151 4 KB memory module
CE-152 Cassette recorder (as external storage) (same as General Electric 3-5160A)
CE-153 Software board
CE-154 Wallet dedicated to PC-1500 + CE-150 + CE-152 + CE-153
CE-155 8 KB memory module
CE-156 Tape with Katakana software
CE-157 4 KB memory module with CR2032 battery data backup and Katakana chars ROM
CE-158 Communication dock with RS-232C and parallel interface with (4 rechargeable, shrink-wrapped, permanently built-in) NiCd battery (AA) as additional power supply for the computer.
CE-159 8 KB memory module with CR2032 battery data backup
CE-160 7.6 KB read only memory module with CR2032 battery data backup
CE-161 16 KB memory module with CR2032 battery data backup
CE-162E Tape and parallel port interface
CE-163 32 KB (2x16 KB) dual-page memory module with CR2032 battery data backup. Only one page (16 KB) can be accessed at a time, switchable via the following command in PROG mode:
                     Page 0 [enter] POKE&5804,0 [enter]
                     Page 1 [enter] POKE&5804,1 [enter]

Related Sharp pocket computers

 Sharp PC-1210
 Sharp PC-1211
 Sharp PC-1251
 Sharp PC-1500
 Sharp PC-1500A upgrade version with 8 KB onboard RAM
 Sharp PC-1501  Japanese version of PC-1500A
 Sharp PC-1600 with more memory and larger multi-line LCD display and more graphics capabilities

BASIC compatibility with early models
Some earlier model PC-1500s will show a value 1 less in the FOR...NEXT counter on exiting the loop compared to later PC-1500s and the PC-1600.

For example:

10 FOR K=1 TO 10
20 NEXT K
30 PRINT K

K will be set to 11 on later model PC-1500s and PC-1600s, but will be 10 on early PC-1500s.

Consider this example:

10 S=0
20 FOR K=1 TO 10 STEP 4
30 S=S+1
40 NEXT K
50 PRINT S

S will be set to 3 on later model PC-1500s and PC-1600s, but will be 4 on early PC-1500s.

Early model PC-1500s evaluate IF...THEN statements differently. The behaviour can be summarised thus:

An early model PC-1500 can be detected by using the command: PEEK&C5C0.

If the value returned is 6, it is an early model.

Example program in BASIC
  1 ARUN 10
  5 REM   "PC1500 VAT Program:"
 10 INPUT "Price: ";P
 20 PRINT P;"  ";P*V;"  ";P*V*M   
 30 GOTO 10
 40 END
The PC-1500 allows special abbreviations, and the syntax can also look as follows:
 20 PRINT P;"  ";PV;"  ";PVM

Usage of variables 
 P = Purchase Price
 V = VAT (%/100)     - To be input by hand before calculation begins, e.g.: V=1.14 (Enter)
 M = Markup (%/100)  - To be input by hand before calculation begins, e.g.: M=1.15 (Enter)

Display of the answers are as follows 
 Answer1;            Answer2;         Answer3
 Purchase Price;     VAT Price;       Sales Price
 Value: P;           Value: P*V;      Value: P*V*M

Program description

Significance

The design of initial prototypes of EMKE series of public transport cash registers were built around customized versions of the PC-1500 and its Hungarian clone PTA-4000. The series production models used almost exclusively in Hungarian regional and national bus services up to present day, are built around a version designed by EMKE and are heavily influenced by the PC-1500 design.

Emulation 
With the SHARP PC-1500A emulator and the PockEmul you can emulate a PC-1500A.

See also 
Sharp pocket computer character sets

References

External links

Sharp Programmables
PC-1500 Data Sheet
PC-1500
Sharp PC-1500 computer (TRS-80 PC-2) resource page
pc-1500.info Sharp computer (and clones) resource site
www.promsoft.com/calcs Sharp Pocket Computers
PockEmul - is a Sharp Pocket Computer emulator.
 SHARP PC-1500A Emulator

PC-1500
PC-1500